Dan Schneider (born February 2, 1965) is an American poet and critic of literature and film who runs the criticism and literary website Cosmoetica.

Biography
Schneider was born in 1965 to an unmarried Minnesota mother. Placed for adoption in New York City, Schneider grew up with a working-class family in the Glendale-Ridgewood neighborhoods of Queens, New York. According to his memoir and press accounts, at age six Schneider witnessed a murder, the first of many. During high school, Schneider was a gang member. , Schneider lives in Texas.

Poetry
When Schneider was in his mid-20s, he moved to Minnesota to learn more about his biological family. While living in the Twin Cities, Schneider became involved in local poetry readings and poetry slams.  Schneider became known for his poetry, ability to critique others, and criticism of academic-style poetry, what he called the incestuous nature of poetry, where writers praised each other's works in a self-promotional cycle.

This latter quality made him controversial. In one reported instance, Schneider attended a poetry reading by Robert Bly. During the question-and-answer session, Schneider asked why Bly was "such a lousy poet". Schneider followed this by quoting from an essay Bly once wrote on Robert Lowell, in which Bly talked about the younger generation needing to destroy the old, and how trees needed to burn to save the forest. Schneider said that's what he wanted to do for poetry.

Schneider's poetry has been praised by Waswo X. Waswo.

Publications
In 2008, Schneider's review of British author Zadie Smith's novel White Teeth was a featured excerpt in Contemporary Fiction: The Novel Since 1990, edited by Pamela Bickley, and published by Cambridge University Press. His reviews have also been reprinted or excerpted in a number of places, including on the book Design and Truth from Yale University Press. and in The God Problem: How A Godless Cosmos Creates by Howard Bloom.

Schneider's other writings have been published in a number of publications including Monsters & Critics 10,000 Monkeys, Dublin Quarterly, Culture Vulture, No Ripcord Magazine, BlogCritics, CriticalCritics.com, and HackWriters.

Media coverage
In 1999, the alternative newspaper City Pages (at the time the sister paper of the Village Voice) printed a cover story about Schneider. The article, titled "Dan Schneider vs. the Rest of the World," focused on Schneider's attempts to change what he saw as the incestuous nature of the Twin Cities' poetry scene. In addition to samples of Schneider's own poetry, the article featured comments about Schneider from both supporters and detractors. Many readers, including established poets from the area, responded to the article, with most of the poets condemning Schneider and most general readers praising his honesty.

He has been quoted in such publications as The Village Voice, The Journal Gazette, and on public radio. Schneider's work has drawn both praise and criticism from other online publications, including Web del Sol Flashpoint Magazine, and Quarterly Literary Review Singapore.

Cosmoetica
Schneider founded his website, Cosmoetica, in 2001. In 2007, Ranking.com ranked Cosmoetica in the top half million literary websites.

In 2004, Schneider's Cosmoetica website was discussed in a New York Times article, "The Widening Web of Digital Lit" by David Orr. Schneider was quoted as describing his own poems as "better than Walt Whitman" while T.S. Eliot was assessed as "1 of the most grossly overrated writers in the history of the world, & the English language". Schneider and Cosmoetica has been cited in a number of academic and related books including The Creative Writing MfA Handbook, Contemporary Fiction: The Novel Since 1990, and a number of other books including Best of the Web 2009.

Poet Al Rocheleau said that the site has "a clearly anti-establishment take on the academic poetry scene, as well as fearless, brilliant assessments of many poets, including the famous, with which you may or may not agree."

Film criticism 

In late 2006 Schneider further expanded his website to include an all film subsite called Cinemension. Schneider has published his film reviews in a number of online publications. His reviews are also aggregated on Rotten Tomatoes.

Schneider's film criticism was praised by Roger Ebert, who called him a "considerable critic".

References

External links
 Cosmoetica Schneider's website of poetry, writings, and criticism.
Schneider's personal page at Blogcritics

1965 births
20th-century American male writers
21st-century American male writers
21st-century American poets
American adoptees
American essayists
American film critics
American literary critics
American male bloggers
American bloggers
American male essayists
American male poets
Literary critics of English
Living people
People from Ridgewood, Queens
Poets from Minnesota
Poets from New York (state)
Poets from Texas
Writers from Queens, New York
20th-century American writers